The Demons of Red Lodge and Other Stories is a Big Finish Productions audio drama based on the long-running British science fiction television series Doctor Who. It features the winner of Big Finish's Opportunity for New Writers contest in which they accepted unsolicited amateur submissions. Rick Briggs's "The Entropy Composition" was chosen from about 1200 submissions. It stars Peter Davison as The Doctor and Sarah Sutton as Nyssa.

The Demons of Red Lodge
by Jason Arnopp

Nyssa and the Doctor suddenly wake up in Red Lodge, Suffolk in the year 1665. Panicked by recent memory loss, they quickly run into some very familiar faces.
 Emily Cobham/Ivy Cobham – Susan Kyd
 Villagers – Duncan Wisbey, John Dorney

The Entropy Composition
by Rick Briggs

White Waves, Soft Haze, a prog rock symphony by Geoff Cooper, was produced in 1968, but never released.
 Erisi – Andree Bernard
 Naloom – Ian Brooker
 Mrs Moloney – Joanna Monro
 Geoff Cooper – James Fleet

Doing Time
by William Gallagher

The Doctor spends over a year locked up in a prison on the planet Folly. 
 Janson Hart – John Dorney
 Governor Chaplin – Susan Kyd
 Dask/Judge/Jabreth/Hobbling Pete – Duncan Wibsey

Special Features
by John Dorney

The Doctor contributes DVD Commentary to a 1970s horror movie, Doctor Demonic's Tales of Terror.
 Martin Ashcroft – James Fleet
 Sir Jack Merrivale/Professor Bromley/Narrator – Ian Brooker
 Johanna Bourke/Carlotta – Joanna Monro
 Mr Pinfield/Yokel/Running Man/Carriage Driver – John Dorney

External links
The Demons of Red Lodge and Other Stories 

2010 audio plays
Fifth Doctor audio plays
Fiction set in 1665
Fiction set in 1968
Fiction set in 2001